Pyotr Ivanovich Podgorodetsky (born 12 February 1957) is a Russian musician and showman. He was the keyboardist of the rock band Mashina Vremeni in 1979-1982 and 1990-1999, respectively. He also worked in the group Voskreseniye and led a program on television and radio. At the present time, he leader of the group X.O.

He was awarded the honorary title Honored Artist of the Russian Federation (1999).

References

External links
 Интервью с Подгородецким и Ломидзе
 Еврей из машины

1957 births
Living people
Musicians from Moscow
Recipients of the Order of Honour (Russia)
Honored Artists of the Russian Federation
Soviet composers
Soviet male composers
Russian composers
Russian male composers
Soviet male singers
Russian television presenters
20th-century Russian poets
21st-century Russian poets
21st-century male writers
Russian radio personalities
Russian rock singers
Soviet songwriters
Russian songwriters
Russian keyboardists
20th-century Russian male writers
20th-century Russian male singers
20th-century Russian singers